Shahrdari Arak BC is an Iranian professional basketball team based in Arak and was founded in 2011. The team compete in the Iranian Super League. They play their home games at Arak Emam Khomeini Arena .

Franchise history 
Shahrdari Arak BC Qualified to Iran's division 2  in 2014. In the Iran's division 2 league they became third team that could Qualified to Iranian Super League in 2015.

Tournament records

Iranian Super League 
 2015-2016 : 4th place 
 2016-2017: 4th place

References

External links 
 page on Asia-Basket

Basketball teams established in 2011
Arak, Iran
2011 establishments in Iran
Basketball teams in Iran